Osteochilus nashii, also known a
Osteochilichthys godavariensis
Osteochilichthys nashii
Osteochilus malabaricuss Nash's barb, Nash barb, or black borde r tail orange, a species of cyprinid fish endemic to India.

Named in honor of “Dr. Nash,” probably John Pearson Nash (1828-1885), Surgeon, H.M. Madras Army, who collected type.

References

Taxa named by Francis Day
Fish described in 1869
Osteochilus